American singer-songwriter Aaron Carter released six studio albums (including one posthumously), three extended plays (EP), three compilation albums, five video albums and forty four singles (including five as a featured artist). He sold more than 4 million albums in the United States, as of 2013, and more than 10 million records worldwide. Aaron Carter released his debut single "Crush on You" in 1997, which was a Top 10 in Australia, Germany and the United Kingdom. His self-titled debut album was released in the same year in Europe, and sold more than 1 million copies worldwide. In 2000 Aaron signed with Jive Records and released three more studio albums; the first of them, Aaron's Party (Come Get It), was his most successful album, and sold more than three million copies in United States alone, being certified 3× Platinum by RIAA. Carter released the EP Love in 2017 after fourteen years since his last album with new material; he followed this in 2018 with the full-length album of the same name.

Albums

Studio albums

Compilations

Extended plays

Singles

As lead artist

As featured artist

Guest appearances

Videography

See also
 List of songs recorded by Aaron Carter

References

External links
 Aaron Carter on YouTube

Pop music discographies
Discographies of American artists
Discography